Cavally may refer to:
 the Cavalla River in West Africa
 Cavally Region, a region of Ivory Coast in the Montagnes District
 a common French name for the Bar jack, or Caranx ruber